Lophiocharon lithinostomus, known as the marble-mouthed frogfish, is a species of fish in the family Antennariidae native to the Western Pacific. It is known from the Sulu Sea, where it inhabits coastal reefs and occurs at a depth range of 1 to 10 m (3 to 33 ft). It is a demersal oviparous fish reaching 9.1 cm (3.6 in) SL. The species is noted to closely resemble a rock covered in algae.

References 

Antennariidae
Fish of the Pacific Ocean
Fish described in 1908